In mathematics, a Banach bundle is a fiber bundle over a topological Hausdorff space, such that each fiber has the structure of a Banach space.

Definition 
Which satisfies the following conditions:
 The map  is continuous for all 
 The operation  is continuous
 For every , the map  is continuous
If the map  is only upper semi-continuous,  is called upper semi-continuous bundle.

Examples

Trivial bundle 
Let A be a Banach space, X be a topological Hausdorff space. Then  is a Banach bundle, called the trivial bundle

See also 
 Banach bundles in differential geometry

References 

Noncommutative geometry
Banach spaces